Aron (Aaron) Fernandez (or Fernandes according to some sources, or Fernando, as he authored) (Livorno, 1761–1828) was a Jewish-Italian teacher of ancient and new languages, and a translator. Considered an extremist by the civil and religious (Jewish and Christian) authorities of Leghorn because of his Jacobin sympathies. Known through the official reprimands to his writings, some of which he managed to publish. Among them:
 an annotated Italian translation of Les Nuits Champêtres by Jean-Charles Thibault de Laveaux, written in 1792 and eventually published only in 1803.
 Lo spettatore libero ovvero speculazioni filosofiche sulla rigenerazione politica, e morale dello spirito umano, published in Milan, anno II della Libertà (1793).
 an Italian translation of Tom Paine's pamphlet Decline and Fall of the English System of Finance. On 29 June 1796, Fernando even managed to meet Napoleon passing through Livorno, to plead his support for the work. The translation was ultimately not published, but Fernando was expelled from Livorno because of it.
 The Progetto filosofico di una completa riforma del culto e dell'educazione politico-morale del popolo ebreo, a radical proposal for the reform of Judaism, announced to appear in two tomes by 1810. The first volume was indeed surreptitiously printed in 1813 by Marenigh in Livorno; after a long series of remands to the censor, which lasted till 1818, and with the changing political climate of the Restoration, almost all printed copies were confiscated and destroyed. The manuscript of the second tome, submitted to the French censor, is conserved at the French National Archives in Paris.

References 

Italian translators
19th-century Italian writers
19th-century male writers
Jewish Italian writers
Reform Judaism
Livornese Jews
1761 births
1828 deaths
19th-century translators